Sisurcana topina is a species of moth of the family Tortricidae. It is found in Ecuador in the provinces of Morona-Santiago, Tungurahua and Napo and in Peru.

References

Moths described in 2004
Sisurcana
Moths of South America
Taxa named by Józef Razowski